Georg Hüsing (4 June 1869 – 1 September 1930) was an Austrian historian and philologist who specialized in Germanic studies and mythography.

Biography
Georg Hüsing was born in Liegnitz, Kingdom of Prussia (now Legnica, Poland) on 4 June 1869. He studied ancient history, Indo-European, Semitic, Iranian and German at the universities of Breslau, Berlin and Königsberg. Upon receiving his Ph.D. at Königsberg, Hüsing worked as a private lecturer. 

In 1912, Hüsing he joined the University of Vienna, first as a lecturer, and then as a professor, where he taught the history of ancient peoples in the Near East. At Vienna, Hüsing founded what is known as the Vienna School of Mythology. A prominent member of the German nationalist movement in Austria, Hüsing was the founder of the  movement. He was a co-founder of the Orientalistischen Literatur-Zeitung and the Mythologischen Bibliothek. With , Hüsing founded Mitra. Monatsschrift für vergleichende Mythenforschung, which edited until 1920.

See also
 Rudolf Much

Selected works
 (1905) Semitische Lehnwörter im Elamischen. Leipzig: Hinrichs.
 (1906) Beiträge zur Kyros-Sage. Berlin: Preiser.
 (1908) Der Zagros und seine Völker. Eine archäologisch-ethnographische Skizze. Leipzig: Hinrichs.
 (1909). Die iranische Überlieferung und das arische System. Leipzig: Hinrichs.
 (1911). Krsaaspa im Schlangenleibe und andere Nachträge zur Iranischen Überlieferung. Leipzig: Hinrichs.
 (1916) Völkerschichten in Iran. Wien: Hölder.
 (1927) Die deutschen Hochgezeiten. Wien: Eichendorff-Haus.
 (1928) Germanische Gottheiten. Wien: Eichendorff-Haus.
 (1932) mit Emma Hüsing. Deutsche Laiche und Lieder. Wien: Eichendorff-Haus.
 (1934) mit Edmund Mudrak.  Die vierte Märge. Wien: Gesellschaft Deutsche Bildung.
 (1937) mit Heinrich Lessmann. Der deutsche Volksmund im Lichte der Sage. Berlin: Stubenrauch.

Sources

 Olaf Bockhorn: Von Ritualen, Mythen und Lebenskreisen. Volkskunde im Umfeld der Universität Wien. In: Wolfgang Jacobeit, Hannjost Lixfeld (Hg.). Völkische Wissenschaft. Gestalten und Tendenzen der deutschen und österreichischen Volkskunde in der ersten Hälfte des 20. Jahrhunderts.  Böhlau, Wien 1994, S. 477–526.
 Olaf Bockhorn: „Die Angelegenheit Dr. Wolfram, Wien“. Zur Besetzung der Professur für germanisch-deutsche Volkskunde an der Universität Wien. In: Mitchell Ash, Wolfram Niess, Ramon Pils (Hg.): Geisteswissenschaften im Nationalsozialismus. Das Beispiel der Universität Wien. Vandenhoeck & Ruprecht unipress, Göttingen 2010, S. 199–224.
 Elfriede Moser-Rath: Hüsing, Georg. In: Rolf Wilhelm Brednich (Hg.): Enzyklopädie des Märchens. Band 6: Gott und Teufel auf Wanderschaft – Hyltén-Cavallius. De Gruyter, Berlin 1990, Sp. 1411–1412.
 Falco Pfalzgraf: Karl Tekusch als Sprachpfleger. Seine Rolle in Wiener Sprachvereinen des 20. Jahrhunderts (= Greifswalder Beiträge zur Linguistik, Bd. 10). Hempen, Bremen 2016.
 Peter Rohrbacher: Encrypted Astronomy, Astral Mythologies, and Ancient Mexican Studies in Austria, 1910–1945. In: Revista de Antropologia. Universidade de São Paulo, Jg. 62 (2019), Sonderheft German and German-speaking Anthropologists in Brazil, S. 140–161 (online).
 Leopold Schmidt: Geschichte der österreichischen Volkskunde. Österreichischer Bundesverlag, Wien 1951.

1869 births
1930 deaths
Austrian philologists
Germanic studies scholars
Iranologists
Mythographers
People from Legnica
Semiticists
University of Königsberg alumni
Academic staff of the University of Vienna
Writers on Germanic paganism